Sound City may refer to: 

 Soundcity TV, a Nigerian television music channel
 Sound City (company), defunct British amplification company
 Sound City Studios, music recording studios 
 Sound City (film), a 2013 documentary film produced and directed by Dave Grohl
 Sound City: Real to Reel, soundtrack for the Sound City film

See also
 Sound City Players, supergroup formed by Dave Grohl
 Shepperton Film Studios, film studios historically known as Sound City